Cherry Creek is an unincorporated community in Pontotoc County, Mississippi.

References

Unincorporated communities in Pontotoc County, Mississippi